The men's 10,000 metres event at the 1948 Olympic Games took place July 30.  The final was won by Emil Zátopek of Czechoslovakia.

Records
Prior to the competition, the existing World and Olympic records were as follows.

The following new Olympic record was set during this competition:

Schedule
All times are British Summer Time (UTC+1).

Results

Final

Key: DNF = Did not finish, NP = Not placed, OR = Olympic record

References

Notes
Organising Committee for the XIV Olympiad, The (1948). The Official Report of the Organising Committee for the XIV Olympiad. LA84 Foundation. Retrieved 5 September 2016.

Athletics at the 1948 Summer Olympics
10,000 metres at the Olympics
Men's events at the 1948 Summer Olympics